Birte Steven (born 11 October 1980) is a German former swimmer, who specialized in breaststroke events. She is a ten-time All-Pacific honoree, and also a sixth-place finalist in the 200 m breaststroke at the 2007 FINA World Championships in Melbourne, Australia. Since 2007, Steven currently holds a long-course German record of 2:25.33 from the national championships.

Steven qualified for the women's 200 m breaststroke at the 2004 Summer Olympics in Athens, by attaining an A-standard entry time of 2:25.95 from the German Olympic trials. In the morning's preliminary heats, Steven recorded the seventh fastest time of 2:27.42 to secure her spot in the semifinal run. On the evening session, Steven failed to qualify for the final, as she placed eleventh overall in the semifinals, with a time of 2:29.22.

Steven is also a member of the swimming team for the Oregon State Beavers, and a former student major in psychology at the Oregon State University in Corvallis, Oregon.

References

External links
Player Bio – Oregon State Beavers

1980 births
Living people
German female swimmers
Olympic swimmers of Germany
Swimmers at the 2004 Summer Olympics
Female breaststroke swimmers
Sportspeople from Hanover
Oregon State Beavers women's swimmers